Mångby River (Swedish: Mångbyån) is a river in Sweden.

References

Rivers of Västerbotten County